Angola women's national basketball team is the basketball team which represents Angolan women internationally. In 2011 FIBA Africa Championship for Women They  won their first Continental African title and they qualified for the first time to 2012 Summer Olympics. They have made their only appearance so far in the FIBA Women's Basketball World Cup in 2014, where they finished last among 16 teams.

History

FIBA Africa Championship for Women 2007
The squad traveled to Senegal for the FIBA Africa Championship for Women 2007 in September 2007. It went 4–1 in the first round of the competition, losing only to the Democratic Republic of the Congo once they had clinched advancement to the next round. In the round of single elimination, Angola beat Côte d'Ivoire 44–42, before losing to eventual champion Mali by 9. In the third place game, Angola beat Mozambique by 15 to clinch a spot in the qualifying tournament for the 2008 Summer Olympics.

FIBA Africa Championship for Women 2011
Angola won its first African title at the 2011 FIBA Africa Championship for Women in Bamako, Mali. It finished with a 7–1 record with Small forward Nacissela Maurício being named the tournament's MVP. Moreover, Power forward Sónia Guadalupe was named to the All-Tournament team. With this win, Angola secured a spot at the 2012 Summer Olympics.

Results

Olympic Games

World Cup

African Games

AfroBasket

Angola all-time record against all nations

Team

Current roster
Roster for the 2021 Women's Afrobasket.

Head coach position
 Aníbal Moreira – Sep 2009 – Oct 2014
 Jaime Covilhã – Jun 2015 – Aug 2017

See also
Angola women's national basketball team U-20
Angola women's national basketball team U-18
Angola women's national basketball team U-16

References

External links

FIBA profile
Angolan National Team – Afrobasket.com

 
 
national
Women's national basketball teams